Los Frailes Airstrip  is a dirt airstrip located in Los Frailes, Los Cabos Municipality, Baja California Sur, Mexico.

Los Frailes is a small village located on the Gulf of California coast, in the East Cape area.

It is used solely for general aviation purposes.

Airports in Baja California Sur
Los Cabos Municipality (Baja California Sur)